Christia Spears Brown is an American psychologist and author. She is a professor of psychology and associate chair of development and social psychology at the University of Kentucky College of Arts and Sciences. Brown is the author of several books. Her research interests include gender stereotypes, children and adolescents perception of gender and ethnic discrimination, gender and ethnic identity development, and social inequality.

Education 
Brown earned a B.S., magna cum laude, in psychology at Belmont University in 1996. She earned an M.A. (2000) and Ph.D. (2003) in developmental psychology with a minor in statistics from University of Texas at Austin. Her dissertation was titled Children’s Perceptions of Discrimination: Antecedents and Consequences. Brown's doctoral advisor was Rebecca Bigler.

Career 
In 2003, Brown was an instructor in the department of psychology at Southwestern University. From 2003 to 2007, she was an assistant professor in the department of psychology at University of California, Los Angeles. Brown joined University of Kentucky College of Arts and Sciences (UK)  in 2007 as an assistant professor. She became an associate professor in 2011 and is currently a professor of developmental psychology and Associate Dean of Diversity, Equity, and Inclusion. In 2016, she became the founding director of the UK Center for Equality and Social Justice.

From 2017 to 2019, Brown was chair of the Society for Research in Child Development Equity and Justice Committee.

Research 
Brown researches gender stereotypes, children and adolescents perception of gender and ethnic discrimination, gender and ethnic identity development, and social inequality. Her studies have included examining the perceptions of discrimination by authority figures such as coaches and teachers and sexual harassment of girls. Brown investigates discrimination of immigrant children and parents in studies funded by the Foundation for Child Development and the UK Center for Poverty Research. She is conducting a multi-site study under Rebecca Bigler that exams children's understanding of the relationships between race, poverty, politics, and gender.

Selected works

Books

References

External links 

 
 

Living people
Year of birth missing (living people)
Place of birth missing (living people)
Belmont University alumni
University of Texas at Austin College of Liberal Arts alumni
University of California, Los Angeles faculty
University of Kentucky faculty
American women psychologists
21st-century American psychologists
American social psychologists
American developmental psychologists
21st-century American women scientists
21st-century American women writers
21st-century American non-fiction writers
American women non-fiction writers
Gender studies academics